Federal lands are lands in the United States owned by the federal government. Pursuant to the Property Clause of the United States Constitution (Article 4, section 3, clause 2), Congress has the power to retain, buy, sell, and regulate federal lands, such as by limiting cattle grazing on them. These powers have been recognized in a long line of United States Supreme Court decisions.

The only mention in the United States Constitution of the specific types of land the federal government is authorized to own outside Washington D.C., in Article 1, Section 8, refers to "Places purchased by the Consent of the Legislature of the State in which the same shall be, for the erection of Forts, Magazines, Arsenals, Dock-yards, and other needful Buildings."

The majority of federal lands ( or 95 percent area in 2015) are administered by the Bureau of Land Management (BLM), United States Fish and Wildlife Service (FWS), National Park Service (NPS), or United States Forest Service (USFS). BLM, FWS, and NPS are part of the United States Department of the Interior, while the Forest Service is part of the United States Department of Agriculture. An additional  of land (about 2% of all federal land) is owned by the United States Department of Defense (DOD). The majority of federal lands are located in Alaska and the Western states.

Legal background
The United States Supreme Court has upheld the broad powers of the federal government to deal with federal lands, for example having unanimously held in Kleppe v. New Mexico that "the complete power that Congress has over federal lands under this clause necessarily includes the power to regulate and protect wildlife living there, state law notwithstanding."

Lands held by the United States in trust for Native American tribes are generally not considered public lands. Although the United States holds legal title to these lands, the tribe or individual holds beneficial title (the right to use and benefit from the property). As a result, Indian Country is "quasi-private, not public, land." Nevertheless, "because the United States is a legal title holder, the federal government is a necessary part in all leases and dispositions of resources including trust land. For example, the secretary of the interior must approve any contract for payment or grant by an Indian tribe for services for the tribe 'relative to their lands' (25 U.S.C. § 81)."

History of federal lands
The Land Ordinance of 1785 and the Northwest Ordinance of 1787 provided for the survey and settlement of the lands that the original Thirteen Colonies ceded to the federal government after the American Revolution. As additional lands were acquired by the United States from Spain, France, Native American Nations and other countries, the United States Congress directed that they be explored, surveyed, and made available for settlement. During the Revolutionary War, military bounty land was promised to soldiers who fought for the colonies. After the war, the Treaty of Paris of 1783, signed by the United States, the Kingdom of Great Britain, France, and Spain, ceded territory to the United States. In the 1780s, other states relinquished their own claims to land in modern-day Ohio. By this time, the United States needed revenue to function. Land was sold so that the government would have money to survive. In order to sell the land, surveys needed to be conducted. The Land Ordinance of 1785 instructed a geographer to oversee this work as undertaken by a group of surveyors. The first years of surveying were completed by trial and error; once the territory of Ohio had been surveyed, a modern public land survey system had been developed. In 1812, Congress established the General Land Office as part of the Department of the Treasury to oversee the disposition of these federal lands. By the early 1800s, promised bounty land claims were finally fulfilled.

In the 19th century, other bounty land and homestead laws were enacted to dispose of federal land. These included, among others, the Homestead Act of 1862 and the Desert Lands Entry Act of 1877. Several different types of patents existed. These include cash entry, credit, homestead, Indian, military warrants, mineral certificates, private land claims, railroads, state selections, swamps, town sites, and town lots. A system of local land offices spread throughout the territories, patenting land that was surveyed via the corresponding Office of the Surveyor General of a particular territory. This pattern gradually spread across the entire United States. The laws that spurred mass federal land transfers, with the exception of the General Mining Law of 1872 and the Desert Land Act of 1877, have since been repealed or superseded. 

Between 1781 and 2018, the federal government divested itself of estimated  of public domain land. The vast majority (97%) of transfers of federal land to private ownership occurred before 1940.  Beginning in the early 20th century, U.S. government policy shifted from disposing of public land to retaining and managing it. Congress took additional steps toward recognizing the value of the assets on public lands and directed the Executive Branch to manage activities on the remaining public lands. The Mineral Leasing Act of 1920 allowed leasing, exploration, and production of selected commodities, such as coal, oil, gas, and sodium to take place on public lands. The Taylor Grazing Act of 1934 established the United States Grazing Service to manage the public rangelands by establishment of advisory boards that set grazing fees. The Oregon and California Revested Lands Sustained Yield Management Act of 1937, commonly referred as the O&C Act, required sustained yield management of the timberlands in western Oregon.

Sagebrush Rebellion movement in the Western United States in the 1970s and the 1980s sought major changes to federal land control, use, and disposal policy in 13 western states in which federal land holdings include between 20% and 85% of a state's area. Supporters of the movement wanted more state and local control over the lands, if not outright transfer of them to state and local authorities and/or 

Over that time period, the federal acreage held by the Bureau of Land Management and Department of Defense decreased by 10.2% and 56.8%, respectively, and the federal acreage held by the Forest Service, Fish and Wildlife Service, and National Park Service increased by 0.8%, 2.7%, and 5.0%, respectively. Over the 1990–2018 time period, the largest decline in federal acreage was in Alaska (a decrease of 9.4%, or ) and in the 11 contiguous states of the West (a 3% decrease in federal land, or ).

Primary federal land holders

The four primary federal land holders are:

Department of the Interior
Bureau of Land Management (BLM) - The agency was formed in 1946 from the consolidation of the Grazing Service and the General Land Office. Of these, more than 99% are in the 11 Western states or Alaska. BLM primarily emphasizes rangeland, but also administers lands for purposes other than grazing, including recreation; timber, energy, and mineral extraction; and conservation (including watershed and wildlife/fish habitat).
FWS-administered land is primarily for conservation and promotion of wildlife; however, some other uses (such as resource extraction) are permitted under certain conditions and in certain areas.
There are  official NPS units with a variety of titles, including national park, national monument, national historic site, national recreation area, and national battlefield.
Department of Agriculture
Although Forest Service holdings are mostly in the West, the USFS also manages about 60% of all federal lands in the Eastern United States.

DoD thus administers approximately 1% of federal land. DOD land is mostly military bases and reservations. The largest single DOD-owned, all-land tract is the 2.3-million-acre White Sands Missile Range in New Mexico.

Together, the BLM, FWS, NPS, Forest Service, and DOD manage about 96% of federal land. The remaining 4% of federal land is controlled by other federal agencies, including the United States Army Corps of Engineers, the Bureau of Reclamation, the United States Postal Service, the National Aeronautics and Space Administration, and the U.S. Department of Energy.

Distribution
Federal land is concentrated in the Western United States. Nationwide, the federal government owns 27.4% of all land area. There are significant variations regionally; the federal government owns 61.3% of the land area in Alaska, 46.4% of the land area in the 11 contiguous Western states; and 4.2% of the land area of other states. The state with the highest percentage of land held by the federal government is Nevada (79.6%); the states with the lowest percentage of land held by the federal government are Connecticut and Iowa (0.3%).

Primary laws regarding federal lands
Alaska National Interest Lands Conservation Act
Alaska Native Claims Settlement Act
Endangered Species Act ( et seq.)
Federal Land Policy and Management Act of 1976 (FLPMA)
Federal Land Transaction Facilitation Act  (Baca Act)
Mineral Leasing Act 
National Environmental Policy Act  (NEPA)
Omnibus Public Land Management Act
Taylor Grazing Act ( et seq.)
Wild and Free-Roaming Horses and Burros Act of 1971

Acquired lands
In the United States, acquired lands refer to a category of public lands in federal ownership that were obtained by the federal government through purchase, condemnation, gift, or exchange.

See also
Federal enclave

References

Further reading
 
 Wilson, Randall K. America's Public Lands: From Yellowstone to Smokey Bear and Beyond. Lanham, MD: Rowman & Littlefield Publishers, 2014.

Federal government of the United States
Geography of the United States
Land registration